Alberto Luigi Sangiovanni-Vincentelli (born June 23, 1947) is an Italian-American computer scientist.  He currently sits on the board of directors of Cadence Design Systems, an EDA company he co-founded in 1988.

Biography 
Born in Milan, Italy, Sangiovanni-Vincentelli received his master of science degree in engineering at the Polytechnic University of Milan in 1971. In 1976, he moved to University of California at Berkeley, where he joined the Department of Electrical Engineering and Computer Sciences, and holds the position of Edgar L. and Harold H. Buttner Chair and serves as a full professor.

Since July 2019, he has served as Special Advisor to the Dean of Engineering of the University of California, Berkeley, for Entrepreneurship and as Chair of the Academic Advisors of the Berkeley SkyDeck accelerator.

For 2022 he was awarded the BBVA Foundation Frontiers of Knowledge Award in the category "Information and Communication Technologies".

Dr. Sangiovanni-Vincetelli currently resides in Berkeley, California.

References

External links
 A. Richard Newton Global Technology Leaders Conference – Session 3  Alberto Sangiovanni-Vincentelli speaking at UC Berkeley
 

1947 births
Living people
Electronic design automation people
University of California, Berkeley faculty
Fellow Members of the IEEE
Engineers from Milan
Polytechnic University of Milan alumni
Academic staff of the Polytechnic University of Milan
Members of the United States National Academy of Engineering